The Mini Xplus is a small computer that runs Android 4.0 and is based on the AllWinner A10 SoC. It is sold together with a remote control and is therefore suitable for use as an HTPC.

References

External links
 

Computer-related introductions in 2011
Linux-based devices
Computers and the environment
Nettop
Embedded Linux
Single-board computers
Educational hardware
Home computers